Lebanon competed at the 2012 Summer Paralympics in London, United Kingdom from August 29 to September 9, 2012.  Lebanese Paralympian, Edward Maalouf, who was sponsored by the British Embassy in Beirut, became the only qualified Paralympic athlete representing Lebanon at the London 2012 Paralympics.

Cycling

Road

Men

See also
Lebanon at the Paralympics
Lebanon at the 2012 Summer Olympics

References

2012 in Lebanese sport
2012
Nations at the 2012 Summer Paralympics